Von Braun Ferry Rocket was a concept design for a shuttle spacecraft that was developed by Wernher von Braun in a seminal series of early-1950s Collier's magazine articles, "Man Will Conquer Space Soon!" by Wernher von Braun et al. The Ferry Rocket concept has evolved over time.

Re-creations
The Ferry Rocket is modeled in the following flight and spaceflight simulators:

Orbiter, a freeware simulator by Martin Schweiger
X-Plane

See also

"Man Will Conquer Space Soon"
Reusable launch system

References
Von Braun 1952 by Mark Wade of Encyclopedia Astronautica
The Von Braun Master Plan: National Dream or National Nightmare? 
SPACESHIP HANDBOOK

Proposed reusable launch systems
Cancelled space launch vehicles
Wernher von Braun